John Knoll (born October 6, 1962) is an American visual effects supervisor and chief creative officer (CCO) at Industrial Light & Magic (ILM).   One of the original creators of Adobe Photoshop (along with his brother, Thomas Knoll), he has also worked as visual effects supervisor on the Star Wars prequels and the 1997 special editions of the original trilogy.  He also served as ILM's visual effects supervisor for Star Trek Generations and Star Trek: First Contact, as well as the Pirates of the Caribbean series. Along with Hal Hickel, Charles Gibson and Allen Hall, Knoll and the trio's work on Pirates of the Caribbean: Dead Man's Chest earned them the Academy Award for Best Visual Effects.

Knoll has been praised by directors James Cameron, Gore Verbinski, Guillermo del Toro, and Brad Bird. Del Toro, who worked with Knoll for the first time on Pacific Rim, stated "He basically has the heart of a kid and the mind of a scientist, and that's a great combination."

Knoll is also the inventor of Knoll Light Factory, a lens flare generating software inspired by his work at Industrial Light and Magic.  He was the Computer Graphics Project Designer on The Abyss, an achievement which earned ILM its tenth Oscar, and worked on two Star Trek episodes: Star Trek: The Next Generations pilot episode ("Encounter at Farpoint") and the Star Trek: Deep Space Nine episode "Explorers".  

Knoll had a cameo appearance in Star Wars Episode I: The Phantom Menace as a fighter pilot, helped pitch the story of Rogue One, a feature film set in the Star Wars series, for which he also worked as writer and executive producer.

John Knoll reflected on his work with George Lucas on the Star Wars prequel trilogy: "I still feel like I owe George a lot to have been given that opportunity. On those three films, I feel like I got a whole career’s worth of experience packed into eight years. George never constricted his thinking to what he knew for sure the tools were capable of; his attitude was, “Yeah, well, I’m writing what I want to see, so you guys will figure it out.” I loved that he would constantly throw those challenges out with the confidence [that] you guys will figure it out. That was great."

In 2016 John (alongside with and his brother Thomas) were inducted into the International Photography Hall of Fame and Museum.

At the 2019 Oscars, John and his brother Thomas were awarded a Scientific and Engineering Award for the original architecture, design and development of Photoshop.

Filmography

Awards

Books 
 John Knoll, J. W. Rinzler: Creating the Worlds of Star Wars: 365 Days with CDROM; Book about the Making of the Star Wars Saga;

References

External links
 

1962 births
Living people
Best Visual Effects Academy Award winners
Best Visual Effects BAFTA Award winners
Computer graphics professionals
Visual effects supervisors
Special effects people
Industrial Light & Magic people
Artists from Ann Arbor, Michigan
USC School of Cinematic Arts alumni